PB.DB The Mixtape is a mixtape by Colombian singer Maluma. It was released on 13 January 2015, by Sony Music Colombia. The mixtape was supported by four singles: "La Temperatura", "La Curiosidad", "Carnaval" and "Addicted".

Track listing

Certifications

References

2015 mixtape albums
Maluma albums
Sony Music Colombia albums
Spanish-language albums